Thomas Steven Platz (born 26 June 1955) is an American retired professional bodybuilder. He was known for his leg development, which in his prime measured over 30 inches, earning him the nickname The Quadfather.

Platz was part of Vince McMahon's short-lived World Bodybuilding Federation (WBF). He ambushed the closing ceremonies of Mr. Olympia 1990 to announce its formation, after attending the event with McMahon as representatives of Bodybuilding Lifestyles magazine.

Early life 
Tom Platz was born on June 26, 1955. Upon looking at a Mr. Universe magazine at the age of 11 he decided to become a professional bodybuilder. At the age of 15, he weighed around 165 pounds. Platz later joined Armento’s Gym and was acquainted with Olympic weight lifters Norb Schemansky and Freddie Lowe and learned the proper way to squat. He developed strength and muscle mass rapidly.

|- align=center bgcolor=white valign=middle|                    |- align=center bgcolor=white valign=middle|
|bgcolor=white| 11th  	
|bgcolor=white| 

    

    

|- align=center bgcolor=white valign=middle|                    |- align=center bgcolor=white valign=middle|
|bgcolor=white| 12th  	
|bgcolor=white| IFBB Night of Champions 1980

Books
Pro-style Bodybuilding by Tom Platz (Author), Bill Reynolds (Author),
Paperback: 192 pages,
Publisher: Sterling (20 May 1985),
Language English,
,

Filmography
Who Killed Johnny Love? (1998) .... Emcee 
8 Heads in a Duffel Bag (1997) .... Head of Hugo
Flex...Body Love (1991)....Tom Steel, body builder
Book of Love (1990) .... Body Builder 
Twins (1988) .... Granger Son #1 
The Comeback (also known as Arnold Schwarzenegger - Total Rebuild to Mr. Olympia) (1980) .... Himself

See also 
List of male professional bodybuilders
List of female professional bodybuilders

References

External links
 
Tom Platz Gallery

Flex, 2006

Professional bodybuilders
1955 births
Living people